Aurora Public Library may refer to:

Canada
Aurora Public Library (Ontario)

United States
Aurora Public Library (Colorado), library district
Aurora Public Library (Illinois)
Aurora Public Library (Indiana)